Shakespeare is an English family name most commonly associated with William Shakespeare (1564–1616), an English playwright and poet. Other notable people with the surname include:

Related to the playwright
 Anne Hathaway (wife of Shakespeare) ( 1555– 1623), his wife
 Richard Shakespeare (1490– 1561), his paternal grandfather
 John Shakespeare ( 1531–1601), his father
 Mary Shakespeare ( 1537–1608), his mother
 Gilbert Shakespeare (1566– 1612), his brother
 Joan Shakespeare (1569–1646), his sister
 Edmund Shakespeare (1580–1607), his youngest brother and an actor
 Susanna Shakespeare ( 1583–1649), his daughter
 Judith Shakespeare ( 1585– 1662), his daughter
 Hamnet Shakespeare ( 1585– 1596), his son

Others
 Abraham Shakespeare ( 1966–2009), American lottery winner and murder victim
 Clive Shakespeare (1949–2012), English-born Australian pop guitarist, songwriter, and producer
 Craig Shakespeare (born 1963), former association football player and manager
 Frank Shakespeare (1925–2022), American diplomat and media executive
 Frank Shakespeare (rower) {born 1930), American rower
 Sir Geoffrey Shakespeare, 1st Baronet (1893–1980), British Liberal politician
 James Shakespeare ( 1840–1912), South Australian organist
 Joseph A. Shakspeare (1837–1896), mayor of New Orleans
 Nicholas Shakespeare (born 1957), British novelist and biographer
 Noah Shakespeare (1839–1921), Canadian politician noted for his involvement in the anti-Chinese movement
 Olivia Shakespear (1863–1938), British novelist and playwright
 Percy Shakespeare (1906–1943), British painter
 Robbie Shakespeare (1953–2021), Jamaican musician and producer, part of Sly and Robbie
 Stanley Shakespeare (1963–2005), American football player
 Stephan Shakespeare (born 1957), founder of market research company YouGov and of 18 Doughty Street
 Tom Shakespeare, 3rd Baronet (born 1966), geneticist and sociologist
 William Shakespeare (American football) (1912–1975), American football player
 William Shakespeare (singer) (1948-2010), stage name of Australian singer John Cave (also known as John Cabe or Billy Shake)
 William Shakespeare (tenor) (1849–1931), English tenor, pedagogue, and composer
 William Geoffrey Shakespeare (1927–1996), 2nd Baronet Shakespeare of Lakenham, general practitioner in Aylesbury
 William Harold Nelson Shakespeare (1883–1976), cricketer for Worcestershire in the interwar period

See also
 Shakespear (disambiguation)